Julianne Young is an American politician from Idaho. Young is a Republican member of Idaho House of Representatives from District 31 seat B.

Early life 
Young's father is Richard Hill. Young grew up in Moreland, Idaho. At age 7, Young's family moved to Blackfoot, Idaho. Young graduated from Snake River High School.

Education 
Young earned an Associate degree from Rick's College. Young earned a Bachelor's degree in education from Idaho State University.

Career 
Young is a former certified teacher who became a home-school educator.
Young is a homemaker.

On May 15, 2018, Young won the Idaho Primary election for District 31 seat B. Young defeated incumbent Julie VanOrden with 54.1% of the vote. On November 6, 2018, Young won the election with no opponent and became a Republican member of Idaho House of Representatives for District 31 seat B.

Young is a member of Environment, Energy, and Technology Committee, Judiciary, Rules, and Administration Committee, and State Affairs Committee.

Personal life 
Young's husband is Kevin Young. They have ten children. Young and her family live on a family farm in Blackfoot, Idaho.

References

External links
 Julianne Young at ballotpedia.org

Idaho State University alumni
Living people
Republican Party members of the Idaho House of Representatives
People from Blackfoot, Idaho
Women state legislators in Idaho
Year of birth missing (living people)
21st-century American politicians
21st-century American women politicians